Baby books are scrapbooks used by parents to track their children's development.

History
Baby books first became popular over 100 years ago to keep track of children's diseases, immunization records, and growth. Baby books started appearing more frequently in homes starting in the 1910s, but did not gain popularity until the succeeding decades.

Uses
Baby books can be used to track a child's development or mark developmental milestones. Many have ledgers that can track disease and immunizations. Some books are pre-fabricated with fill-in-the blank areas and places to put special mementos, such as a lock of hair from the baby's first haircut, a hospital bracelet, birth announcements, or cards from the baby shower. Parents may include ultrasound pictures, pictures of the baby at birth, and pictures as the child grows up. Parents can look at baby books for memories.

Baby books have also been used for research. UCLA has a collection of baby books dating back to 1882 used for the study of the history of childhood, family, art, medicine, architecture, and other disciplines.

Various memories can be included in the baby books like birth story, baby shower, naming of the baby, first cry, walking or sitting, first movement, saying first word, as well as various occasions like first Christmas, Easter, Thanksgiving, Pictures for each month Christening/Baptism/Dedication.

References

Baby products
Literary genres